{{DISPLAYTITLE:Cmax (pharmacology)}}

Cmax is the maximum (or peak) serum concentration that a drug achieves in a specified compartment or test area of the body after the drug has been administered and before the administration of a second dose.  It is a standard measurement in pharmacokinetics.

Description 

Cmax is the opposite of Cmin, which is the minimum (or trough) concentration that a drug achieves after dosing.  The related pharmacokinetic parameter tmax is the time at which the Cmax is observed.

After an intravenous administration, Cmax and tmax are closely dependent on the experimental protocol, since the concentrations are always decreasing after the dose. But after oral administration, Cmax and tmax are dependent on the extent, and the rate of drug absorption and the disposition profile of the drug. They could be used to characterize the properties of different formulations in the same subject.

Short term drug side effects are most likely to occur at or near the Cmax, whereas the therapeutic effect of drug with sustained duration of action usually occurs at concentrations slightly above the Cmin.

The Cmax is often measured in an effort to show bioequivalence (BE) between a generic and innovator drug product. According to the FDA, drug quality bioavailability (BA) and BE rely on pharmacokinetic measurements such as AUC and Cmax that are reflective of systemic exposure.

See also
 Cmean (pharmacology)
 Area under the curve (pharmacokinetics)

References 

Pharmacokinetic metrics